Sergei Vladimirovich Losev (born 31 July 1983) is a  Russian former professional football player.

Club career
He made his debut for FC Zenit St. Petersburg on 20 August 2003 in the Russian Premier League Cup semifinal against FC Torpedo Moscow, substituting Vyacheslav Malafeev in added time. Zenit eventually won that cup.

He played 5 seasons in the Russian Football National League for 4 different clubs.

External links
 
 Career summary by sportbox.ru

1983 births
Living people
Russian footballers
Russia under-21 international footballers
Association football goalkeepers
FC Zenit Saint Petersburg players
FC Tom Tomsk players
FC Kuban Krasnodar players
FC Dynamo Barnaul players
FC Neftekhimik Nizhnekamsk players